Felsberg is a town in the Schwalm-Eder district about  south of Kassel.

Geography 
The landscape around Felsberg is marked by hills and small lakes, as well as the remains of gravel quarrying. As part of the West Hesse Depression, it lies in a sunken area that was formed by volcanic activity in the Tertiary sub-era. The change from partly basaltic hills to smooth river valleys is striking. While the river valleys are covered by fluvial sediments, fertile loess beds can be found higher up. The river Eder flows through Felsberg's municipal area. Near Gensungen lies the Heiligenberg ("Holy Mountain") with the ruins of the Heiligenburg Castle.

Constituent communities 
The town consists of 15 communities: Altenbrunslar, Altenburg, Beuern, Böddiger, Gensungen, Helmshausen, Hesserode, Heßlar, Hilgershausen, Lohre, Melgershausen, Neuenbrunslar, Niedervorschütz, Rhünda and Wolfershausen together with the historic Felsberg, to which the other, formerly independent communities were amalgamated on 1 January 1974.

History 

There were settlers in the Felsberg region, as long ago as the last ice age, as witnessed by the find of the 12,000-year-old, so-called Rhünda Skull. In the 1st Century AD, the Felsberg area was inhabited by the Chatti, a Germanic tribe. The only mention of the area from this time is a report by the Roman historian Tacitus about one of Germanicus's campaigns, when in the year 15 he destroyed Mattium (probably nowadays Maden), the Chatti's capital.

In the 8th Century, the Felsberg region was part of the Frankish Empire, and this is when the town was first mentioned in documents.

Within the town's municipal area lie the ruins of three castles; the Felsburg, the Altenburg, in the constituent community of the same name, and the Heiligenburg Castle, above the constituent community of Gensungen, on the river Eder's opposite bank. The town is thus sometimes known as the Drei-Burgen-Stadt ("Three-Castle Town"). The castles were built in the Middle Ages for their strategic locations, during the feud between the Archbishopric of Mainz and the Landgraviate of Thuringia, or Hesse. The Heiligenburg Castle belonged to Mainz. The Salzstraße ("Salt Road") ran through Felsberg from the river Werra, where the salt was mined, to the Rhineland.

In 1090, Felsberg was mentioned in a Mainz document under the name Velisberc, and again under the same name in 1209 in a good's directory from the Petrus Estate in Fritzlar. Felsberg's first documentary mention as a town came in 1286. The historic town core was once surrounded by an 830m-long town wall, only parts of which are preserved today.

A house of Premonstratensian canonesses, the Eppenberg Priory, was established here in about 1217, on the Eppenberg in Gensungen. This was dissolved in 1438, and rebuilt as a Carthusian monastery, Eppenberg Charterhouse, which was secularised in 1527.

In 1526, Felsberg became Evangelical under Philip the Magnanimous, after a resolution by the Homberg Synod.

The Thirty Years' War brought widespread destruction to Felsberg.

In the Second World War, Felsberg was heavily damaged by aerial bombardment and the destruction of the Edertal Dam.

Politics 

The town council has 37 members. The last two municipal elections gave the following results:

|-
! 
! style="text-align:center;" colspan="2"| 2006 
! style="text-align:center;" colspan="2"| 2011 
|-
! Parties
! Votes %
! Seats
! Votes %
! Seats
|-
| style="text-align:left;" | Social Democratic Party (SPD)
| 53.9
| 20
| 50.3
| 19
|-
| style="text-align:left;" | Christian Democratic Union (CDU)
| 23.8
| 9
| 21.6
| 8
|-
| style="text-align:left;" | Alliance 90/The Greens
| 6.4
| 2
| 14.5
| 5
|-
| style="text-align:left;" | Free Democratic Party (FDP)
| 5.7
| 2
| 4.9
| 2
|-
| style="text-align:left;" | Free Voters (FWG)
| 5.0
| 2
| 4.4
| 2
|-
| style="text-align:left;" | Die Freien Bürger (DFB)
| 5.2
| 2
| 4.4
| 1
|-

! style="text-align:left;" | Total
! style="text-align:right;" | 100
! style="text-align:right;" | 37
! style="text-align:right;" | 100
! style="text-align:right;" | 37
|}

The town executive (Magistrat) consists of 14 councillors and the mayor. Of those, 8 seats are held by the SPD, 3 by the CDU and one seat each by the Alliance 90/The Greens, the FDP and the FWG.

The last three elected mayors were:

Klaus Stiegel was mayor of Felsberg for 24 years.

Coat of arms 
The town's civic coat of arms has been known since 1570, when it was displayed at the Schloss Rotenburg (a stately home in Rotenburg an der Fulda, built by Landgrave Ludwig II in 1540). It was also published in the Hessisches Wappenbuch ("Hessian Arms Book") by Wilhelm Wessel in 1633.

Heraldically, the arms might be described thus: Party per pale gules and argent, thereover a bend sinister vert, therein three trefoils argent.

Town partnerships 
Felsberg is twinned with the following towns:
  Vernouillet, France
  Cheddar, United Kingdom
It also has friendship agreements with these places:
  Felsberg, a constituent community of Überherrn, Saarland
  Felsberg, Graubünden, Switzerland
  Dingelstädt, Thuringia

Personalities 
 Benjamin Bramer (1588-1652), artist, architect, builder, geodesist, mathematician
 Egbert Hayessen, (1913-1944), resistance fighter against the Third Reich
 Harold Goldsmith, born Hans Goldschmidt (1930–2004), American Olympic foil and épée fencer
 Günter Böttcher (1954-2012), German handball player, coach and university lecturer

References

External links 

Schwalm-Eder-Kreis